Novorossiyka is the name of several rural localities in Russia:
Novorossiyka, Mazanovsky District, Amur Oblast, a selo in Novorossiysky Selsoviet of Mazanovsky District, Amur Oblast
Novorossiyka, Romnensky District, Amur Oblast, a selo in Verkhnebelsky Selsoviet of Romnensky District, Amur Oblast